The geographical regions of Turkey comprise seven regions which were originally defined at the country's First Geography Congress in 1941. These seven regions are subdivided into twenty one sections, which are further split into numerous areas as defined by microclimate and bounded by local geographic formations.

"Regions" as defined in this context are merely for geographic, demographic, and economic purposes, and do not refer to an administrative division.

Regions and subregions

 Aegean Region
Aegean Section
Edremit Area
Bakirçay Area
Gediz Area
İzmir Area
Küçük Menderes Area
Büyük Menderes Area
Mentese Area
 Inner Western Anatolia Section

 Black Sea Region
 Western Black Sea Section
Inner Black Sea Area
Küre Mountains Area
 Central Black Sea Section
 Canik Mountains Area
 Inner Central Black Sea Area
 Eastern Black Sea Section
 Eastern Black Sea Coast Area
 Upper Kelkit - Çoruh Gully

 Central Anatolia Region
 Konya Section
  Plateau
 Konya - Ereğli Vicinity
 Upper Sakarya Section
 Ankara Area
 Porsuk Gully
 Sündiken Mountain Chain Area
 Upper Sakarya Area
 Konya - Ereğli Vicinity
 Middle Kizilirmak Section
 Upper Kizilirmak Section

 Eastern Anatolia Region
 Upper Euphrates Section
 Erzurum - Kars Section
 Upper Murat - Van Section
 Upper Murat Area
 Van Area
 Hakkâri Section

 Marmara Region
 Çatalca - Kocaeli Section
Adapazarı Area
Istanbul Area
 Ergene Section
 Southern Marmara Section
Biga - Gallipoli Area
Bursa Area
Karesi Area
Samanlı Area
 Yıldız Section

 Mediterranean Region
 Adana Section
Çukurova - Taurus Mountains Area
Antakya - Kahramanmaras Area
 Antalya Section
Antalya Area
Göller Area
Taseli - Mut Area
Teke Area

 Southeastern Anatolia Region
Middle Euphrates Section
Gaziantep Area
Şanlıurfa Area
 Tigris Section
Diyarbakır Area
Mardin - Midyat Area

Distinctions of the regions 
The Aegean Region has:
 the longest coastline

The Black Sea Region has:
  highest annual precipitation
  largest forest area
  fewest sunshine hours
  most landslides

The Central Anatolia Region has:
  lowest annual precipitation,
  most erosion

The Eastern Anatolia Region  has:
  largest area
  highest elevation
  lowest annual temperature
  coldest winters
  highest temperature difference  between seasons
  most volcanic activity
  smallest population
  highest mineral resources

The Marmara Region has:
  smallest area
  lowest elevation
  most climate diversity
  highest energy consumption,
  coolest summers,
  largest population

The Mediterranean Region  has:
  highest annual temperature
  mildest winters
  wettest winters,
  most greenhouse farming 

The Southeastern Anatolia Region has:
  hottest summers
 driest summers
  smallest forest area
 most sunshine hours

Population by region

Sources 

1941 establishments in Turkey

Regions of Turkey
Regions